Kenneth Amis (born 1970) is a Bermudian tuba player best known for his association with the Empire Brass.  He is also the assistant conductor of the MIT Wind Ensemble, a group he has been involved with since its creation in 1999.  In addition, as of 2005, Amis is an Affiliated Artist of MIT.

He was born and raised in Bermuda.  He began studying at Boston University at age 16.  After that, he earned a master's degree from the New England Conservatory of Music.  Amis held the International Brass Chair at the Royal Academy of Music in London.  He teaches at Lynn University.

Amis is the first known person to transcribe Bach's Art of Fugue for wind ensemble (all of the fugues and canons).

He currently resides in Norwood, Massachusetts.

Performances 
At many Empire Brass concerts, Amis performs the piano solo from the third movement of Mozart's Sonata in A on his tuba. In addition to his work with the Empire Brass, Amis has performed on tuba for:
English Chamber Orchestra
Tanglewood Festival Orchestra
New World Symphony Orchestra
Palm Beach Opera Orchestra

Compositions and commissions 
His first published work was A Suite for Bass Tuba, composed when he was fifteen years old.  He has been commissioned to write music for many groups including:
Belmont High School Band
The Massachusetts Instrumental Conductors Association
New England Conservatory Wind Ensemble
University of Scranton
College Band Directors National Association
Pro Arte Chamber Orchestra of Boston
Boston Classical Orchestra
MIT Wind Ensemble

Teaching 
Amis is on the faculty at the Longy School of Music, the Boston Conservatory, Boston University, Lynn University, and MIT.

References

External links 
Kenneth Amis
Amis Musical Circle

1970 births
Living people
Bermudian musicians
African-American classical composers
American classical composers
African-American male classical composers
American male conductors (music)
African-American conductors (music)
American classical tubists
Boston University alumni
Massachusetts Institute of Technology faculty
Academics of the Royal Academy of Music
People from Norwood, Massachusetts
American male classical composers
21st-century American conductors (music)
21st-century tubists
21st-century American male musicians
21st-century African-American musicians
20th-century African-American people